The Narkatiaganj–Bhikhna Thori line is a rail line in eastern India that connects Narkatiaganj and Bhikhna Thori near the Indo-Nepal border.

History 
Railway lines in the area were pioneered by Tirhut Railway and the Bengal and North Western Railway lines in the 19th century.  In his book The Indian Empire, Its People, History and Products W.W.Hunter says, "The Tirhut State Railway with its various branches  intersects Northern Behar and is intended to extend to the Nepal frontier  on one side and to Assam on the other."

The area was laid with metre-gauge tracks. The  Samastipur–Narkatiaganj loop was developed in stages between 1875 and 1907. The Samastipur–Darbhanga line opened for famine relief in 1874 and opened to the public on 1 November 1875. The -long Nirmali branch (Darbhanga–Nirmali) opened between 1883 and 1886. The Sakri–Jainagar branch opened in 1905. The Jhanjharpur–Laukaha Bazar line opened in 1976.

Gauge conversion 
Presently services are suspended on this 36 km line since 2015, as it is undergoing gauge conversion, from  metre gauge  to  broad gauge. The final section between Gawnaha and Bhikhna Thori (13 km) passes through dense forest and needs a special permit from the Forest Department allowing construction works. As of August 2019, the permit has not been given. According to the forest department, Gawnaha–Bhikhna Thori section should be closed and the railway land transferred to them.

References

External links
 Trains at Narkatiaganj

|

5 ft 6 in gauge railways in India
Railway lines in Bihar